Isaiah Alexander Ford (born February 9, 1996) is an American football wide receiver who is currently a free agent. He played college football at Virginia Tech. He was drafted by the Dolphins in the seventh round of the 2017 NFL Draft.

Early years
Ford attended Trinity Christian Academy in Jacksonville, Florida. While there, he played high school football. As a senior, he had 717 yards receiving and 12 touchdowns. He was rated by Rivals.com as a three-star recruit and committed to Virginia Tech to play college football. Ford also played basketball in high school, averaging 37 points per game as a senior.  Ford played AAU basketball with Grayson Allen for the Jacksonville Lee Bull.

College career
As a true freshman at Virginia Tech, Ford played in all 13 games with 11 starts and had 56 receptions for 709 yards and six touchdowns. As a sophomore, he was named first-team All-ACC and set Virginia Tech single-season records for receptions and touchdowns. As a junior, Ford was named second-team All-ACC, recording 73 receptions for 1,038 yards and seven touchdowns. After the season, Ford decided to forgo his senior year and enter the 2017 NFL Draft.

Professional career

Miami Dolphins
Ford was drafted by the Miami Dolphins in the seventh round, 237th overall, in the 2017 NFL Draft. On August 18, 2017, he was placed on injured reserve after suffering a knee injury.

On September 1, 2018, Ford was waived by the Dolphins and was signed to the practice squad. He was promoted to the active roster on November 28, 2018.

On August 31, 2019, Ford was waived by the Dolphins and re-signed to the practice squad. He was promoted to the active roster on September 25, 2019. He was waived again on October 30 and re-signed to the practice squad. He was promoted to the active roster on November 27. In the 2019 season, he recorded 23 receptions for 244 receiving yards.

On April 17, 2020, Ford was re-signed to a one-year contract by the Dolphins.

New England Patriots
On November 3, 2020, Ford was traded to the New England Patriots for a conditional 2022 seventh-round draft pick. On December 5, 2020, Ford was waived.

Miami Dolphins (second stint)
Ford re-signed with the Miami Dolphins' practice squad on December 14, 2020. He was elevated to the active roster on December 19 and December 22 for the team's weeks 15 and 16 games against the New England Patriots and Las Vegas Raiders, and reverted to the practice squad after each game. He was promoted to the active roster on December 30. The Dolphins declined to assign a restricted free agent tender to Ford at the start of the 2021 league year.

On July 16, 2021, Ford re-signed with the Dolphins. He was released on August 24, 2021. He was re-signed to the practice squad on September 6. On October 9, 2021, he was elevated to the active roster for the Dolphins' Week 5 game. He was signed to the active roster on October 23.

New York Giants
On June 7, 2022, Ford signed with the New York Giants.

Indianapolis Colts
On July 26, 2022, Ford signed with the Indianapolis Colts. He was released on August 16, 2022.

References

External links
Miami Dolphins bio
Virginia Tech Hokies bio

1996 births
Living people
Players of American football from Jacksonville, Florida
American football wide receivers
Virginia Tech Hokies football players
Miami Dolphins players
New England Patriots players
Indianapolis Colts players